Xylota nigroaenescens is a species of hoverfly in the family Syrphidae.

Distribution
Borneo, Java, Malaysia, Sumatra.

References

Eristalinae
Insects described in 1875
Taxa named by Camillo Rondani
Diptera of Asia